Till We Have Faces is the eighth solo album by guitarist Steve Hackett.  The album is rock, with elements of world music.  The majority of the album was recorded in Brazil, while the final mixing was done in London. The name of the album comes from a novel by C.S.Lewis, whose work is a long-time influence on Hackett.

As with most of Steve Hackett's records, the sleeve painting was created by his wife at the time, Kim Poor, the Brazilian artist, under the title Silent Sorrow in Empty Boats, after an instrumental piece by Hackett's former group Genesis, on the album The Lamb Lies Down on Broadway.

"A Doll That's Made in Japan" was released as a single. The 7” featured an instrumental version of the song on the B-side. The 12" featured a longer version of the A-side and an exclusive track, "Just the Bones". Apart from the 7” A-side, none of the tracks appeared on the album or its 1994 re-issue.

Track listing (original LP/CD version)
"Duel" (Steve Hackett) – 4:50
"Matilda Smith-Williams Home for the Aged" (Hackett, Nick Magnus) – 8:04
"Let Me Count the Ways" (Hackett) – 6:06
"A Doll That's Made in Japan" (Hackett) – 3:57
"Myopia" (Hackett, Magnus) – 2:56
"What's My Name" (Hackett, Magnus) – 7:05
"The Rio Connection" (Hackett) – 3:24
"Taking the Easy Way Out" (Hackett) – 3:49
"When You Wish upon a Star" (Ned Washington, Leigh Harline) – 0:51

Track listing (1994 CD reissue)
"What's My Name" – 7:06
"The Rio Connection" – 3:21
"Matilda Smith-Williams Home for the Aged" (modified version) – 8:07
"Let Me Count the Ways" – 6:06
"A Doll That's Made in Japan" – 3:57
"Duel" – 4:48
"Myopia" – 2:56
"Taking the Easy Way Out" – 3:50
"The Gulf" – 6:33
"Stadiums of the Damned" – 4:37
"When You Wish Upon a Star" – 0:48

Note: Bonus tracks "The Gulf" and "Stadiums of the Damned" were from the (then) unreleased Feedback 86.  The version of "The Gulf" heard here is missing a brief intro, is faded out early, and has added backing vocals.

Personnel
Steve Hackett – guitars, guitar synth, koto, rainstick, Etruscan guitar, marimba, percussion, harmonica, vocals
Nick Magnus – keyboards, percussion, drum programming
Rui Mota – drums
Sérgio Lima – drums
Ian Mosley – drums, percussion
Waldemar Falcão – flute, percussion
Fernando Moura – Rhodes piano
Ronaldo Diamante – bass
Clive Stevens – wind synthesizer
Kim Poor – Japanese voice on "Doll"
The Brazilian Percussionists – Sidinho Moreira, Junior Homrich, Jaburu, Peninha, Zizinho, Baca

References

See also
Till We Have Faces – A novel by C.S. Lewis

1984 albums
Steve Hackett albums
Music based on novels